Eduardo Arrillaga (born 28 September 1961) is a Mexican rower. He competed at the 1984 Summer Olympics and the 1992 Summer Olympics.

References

External links
 

1961 births
Living people
Mexican male rowers
Olympic rowers of Mexico
Rowers at the 1984 Summer Olympics
Rowers at the 1992 Summer Olympics
Place of birth missing (living people)
Pan American Games medalists in rowing
Rowers at the 1991 Pan American Games
Pan American Games bronze medalists for Mexico
Medalists at the 1991 Pan American Games
20th-century Mexican people
21st-century Mexican people